Mitch Megginson (born 27 July 1992) is a Scottish semi-professional football striker who plays for Cove Rangers.

Club career
Megginson made his debut for Aberdeen in August 2009, playing against Czech Republic opponents Sigma Olomouc in the Europa League.

In April 2010, Megginson joined Second Division club Arbroath on loan until the end of the season. In all he played nine games, scoring four goals for the club in all competitions.

In March 2011, Megginson joined Brechin City on a one-month emergency loan deal. He was again loaned in October 2012, to Alloa Athletic on an emergency loan deal. This was then extended in January 2013 until the end of the season. It was announced on 13 May 2013 that Megginson's contract along with another six players would not be extended.

On 28 June 2013, it was announced that Megginson had signed for Dumbarton on a one-year contract.

On 21 June 2014, Mitch signed a new one-year deal with 'The Sons'. He left the club in May 2015 having featured in every game since joining the team. In total he made 83 appearances for the club, scoring 16 times.

On 5 June 2015, Mitch signed for Scottish Championship side Raith Rovers.

On 27 January 2016, he left Rovers for rival Scottish Championship side Alloa Athletic.

In June 2016, Megginson signed a three-year contract with Highland League champions Cove Rangers, a team for whom his father Mike had played for in the 1990s and early 2000s. He has scored 200 goals for Cove Rangers and has been a part of 3 title winning squads.

International career

Megginson won six caps and has scored three goals for the Scotland under-17 team. He also won one cap and scored one goal for the under-19 team.

Honours
SPFL Top goalscorer: 2019-20 (shared with Lawrence Shankland)

References

1992 births
Aberdeen F.C. players
Alloa Athletic F.C. players
Arbroath F.C. players
Association football forwards
Brechin City F.C. players
Dumbarton F.C. players
Raith Rovers F.C. players
Living people
Scotland youth international footballers
Scottish Professional Football League players
Scottish Football League players
Scottish footballers
Scottish Premier League players
Footballers from Aberdeen
Cove Rangers F.C. players
Highland Football League players